An ornamental animal is an animal kept for display or curiosity, often in a park.  A wide range of mammals, birds and fish have been kept as ornamental animals.  Ornamental animals have often formed the basis of introduced populations, sometimes with negative ecological effects, but a history of being kept as ornamental animals has also preserved breeds, types and even species which have become rare or extinct elsewhere.

This article does not cover animals kept in zoos, wildfowl collections or aquaria.

History

Ornamental animals have been kept for many centuries in several cultures.

Introduced species

Some ornamental animals have escaped from captivity and have formed feral populations.

Conservation

A number of animals have been protected from local or worldwide extinction by being kept as ornamental animals.

List of ornamental animals
The following are breeds or species whose history has included a significant period as ornamental animals, either globally or in particular regions (animals kept primarily in modern zoos, aquaria or waterfowl collections are not included):

Deer
Père David's deer (Elaphurus davidianus): Became extinct in the wild before 1900, but survived in the park of the Chinese Emperor near Peking.  Died out there too, but survived in Woburn Park in England.  Now reintroduced to the wild in China.
Reeves's muntjac (Muntiacus reevesi): Escaped from Woburn Park in England, and now established as a feral animal throughout much of lowland England, causing considerable damage to native woodland.
Sika deer (Cervus nippon): Established in the UK and other places from park escapes.  Poses a hybridisation threat to other deer species such as red deer Cervus elephus.
Water deer (Hydropotes inermis): Another species which has escaped from Woburn Park, having a feral population in the surrounding area of England.
Chital (Axis axis): Endangered deer species in Bangladesh. It is a medium-sized deer species. It is an ornamental animal in Bangladesh and India.

Cattle
British White cattle: White cattle with red or black ears were kept in parks in Britain and Ireland over many hundreds of years.  Polled (hornless) herds and individuals of these formed the basis of the usually black-eared British White.
Galloway cattle: Polled, woolly cattle, originally from Scotland but also often kept as park animals in Britain during the 18th and 19th centuries, especially as colour forms such as the Belted Galloway.
White Park cattle: A white, usually black-eared beef breed derived from horned herds and individuals of the British park cattle.
Chillingham cattle: A red-eared type of White Park which lives only as a feral animal at Chillingham Castle in northern England (and at one other site).
Vaynol cattle:  A black-eared type of White Park recognised as a separate rare breed, from the Vaynol estate in North Wales.

Sheep
Black Welsh Mountain sheep: A colour variety of Welsh Mountain sheep, with a history as an ornamental animal.
Castlemilk Moorit: A short-tailed breed of sheep, developed in Scotland as an ornamental animal from crosses of other breeds and wild sheep.
Hebridean sheep: A black, short-tailed breed of sheep, often multi-horned.  It is derived from multi-coloured sheep kept in the Hebrides since the Iron Age, which became extinct there in the late 19th century.  A population survived in parks in England and Scotland, where they became always black, probably from cross-breeding with another ornamental breed, Jacob sheep.
Jacob sheep: A pied, often multi-horned breed of sheep which was kept in parks in England for several centuries.  Unrelated to other British sheep, but of uncertain origin.

Goats
Bagot goat: A small, pied goat with large horns, kept at Blithfield Hall, Staffordshire, England, reputedly since the Middle Ages, and probably derived originally from similar goats from the Rhone region of Switzerland and France.

Other mammals
Eastern gray squirrel (Sciurus carolinensis): Introduced as an ornamental animal to England and other places, and established as a feral animal; implicated in the steep decline in mainland Great Britain of the native Red Squirrel (Sciurus vulgaris).
Red-necked wallaby (Notamacropus rufogriseus).: Escaped or introduced to various areas in the United Kingdom, France and New Zealand.

Fish 

Guppy (Poecilia reticulata) is an ornamental fish worldwide and it is kept in the aquariums of the fishkeepers.
Goldfish (Carassius auratus) is the most popular ornamental fish in the world.
Koi (Cyprinus rubrofuscus "koi") is the another most popular fish worldwide.
 Siamese fighting fish (Betta splendens)
 Gouramis
 Tetras
 Tiger barb (Puntigrus tetrazona)
 Oscar (Astronotus ocellatus)
 Flowerhorn cichlid

Birds 

Birds' ornamental value derives in part from their feather coloration. Feather colors are often produced by carotenoids.

Peafowl

References 

Conservation biology